The knockout stage of UEFA Euro 2004 was a single-elimination tournament involving the eight teams that qualified from the group stage of the tournament. There were three rounds of matches, with each round eliminating half of the teams entering that round, culminating in the final to decide the champions. The knockout stage began with the quarter-finals on 24 June and ended with the final on 4 July 2004 at the Estádio da Luz in Lisbon. Greece won the tournament with a 1–0 victory over the host nation Portugal.

All times Western European Summer Time (UTC+1)

Format
Any game in the knockout stage that was undecided by the end of the regular 90 minutes, was followed by up to 30 minutes of extra time (two 15-minute halves). For the first time in an international football tournament, the silver goal system was applied, whereby the team who leads the game at the half-time break during the extra time period would be declared the winner. If the scores were still level after the initial 15 minutes of extra time play would continue for a further 15 minutes. If the teams could still not be separated there would be a penalty shoot-out (five penalties each, unless one team gained an unassailable lead, but more if scores were level after the initial five) to determine who progressed to the next round. As with every tournament since UEFA Euro 1984, there was no third place play-off.

Qualified teams
The top two placed teams from each of the four groups qualified for the knockout stage.

Bracket

Quarter-finals

Portugal vs England

France vs Greece

Sweden vs Netherlands

Czech Republic vs Denmark

Semi-finals

Portugal vs Netherlands

Greece vs Czech Republic

Final

References

External links
 UEFA Euro 2004 official history

UEFA Euro 2004
2004
Portugal at UEFA Euro 2004
England at UEFA Euro 2004
Greece at UEFA Euro 2004
Czech Republic at UEFA Euro 2004
knock
Denmark at UEFA Euro 2004
Sweden at UEFA Euro 2004
knock